Gil Sar (IPA: /ɡilʲ/ /sar/) is a freshwater lake located in Srinagar, Jammu and Kashmir, India. It is in a highly deteriorated condition. The lake is sometimes considered a part of the Khushal Sar lake but is separated from it by a narrow strait, which is spanned by a bridge known as Gil Kadal. The Gilsar lake is connected to the Nigeen lake via the Nallah Amir Khan.

References

Further reading 
 

Lakes of Jammu and Kashmir
Srinagar
Water pollution in India